Xinwu may refer to:

 Xinwu District, Taoyuan (新屋區), district of Taoyuan, Taiwan
 Xinwu District, Wuxi (新吴区), district of Wuxi, Jiangsu, China
 Xinwu, Gaocheng, a village in Gaocheng, Sui County, Suizhou, Hubei, China